Extraterrestrial contact may refer to:

 Search for extraterrestrial intelligence
 Potential cultural impact of extraterrestrial contact
 First contact (science fiction)